Prem Chand Bairwa (born 31 August 1969) is an Indian politician from the Bharatiya Janata Party and a member of the Rajasthan Legislative Assembly representing the Dudu Vidhan Sabha constituency of Jaipur, Rajasthan.

References

Bharatiya Janata Party politicians from Rajasthan
Living people
Rajasthan MLAs 2013–2018
1969 births